Ovaness Meguerdonian (born 1929) is an Iranian former alpine skier. He competed at the 1964 Winter Olympics and the 1968 Winter Olympics.

References

External links
 

1929 births
Possibly living people
Iranian male alpine skiers
Olympic alpine skiers of Iran
Alpine skiers at the 1964 Winter Olympics
Alpine skiers at the 1968 Winter Olympics
Sportspeople from Tehran